Boolpoora is an ephemeral lake bed located at 30° 54' 00" S, and 144° 18' 00"E, 54 miles south of Louth, New South Wales, and ten kilometers west of Tilpa, New South Wales. 
When full, the lake has an area of around 480 hectares.

References

Localities in New South Wales
Lakes of New South Wales
Far West (New South Wales)